Vinod Ghosalkar  is an Indian politician and leader of Shiv Sena from Mumbai, Maharashtra. He was member of Maharashtra Legislative Assembly from 2009 to 2014. He was earlier corporator in Municipal Corporation of Greater Mumbai

Positions held
 2009: Elected to Maharashtra Legislative Assembly
 2010 Onwards: Deputy Leader, Shiv Sena  
 2014: Shiv Sena Sampark Pramukh Aurangabad district
 2018 : Appointed as chairman of Mumbai Building Repair And Reconstruction Board

References

External links
 Shivsena Home Page

Shiv Sena politicians
Maharashtra MLAs 2009–2014
Living people
Marathi politicians
Year of birth missing (living people)
Politicians from Mumbai
Place of birth missing (living people)